Mullamangalath Raman Bhattathiripad (1908–2001), also known as M. R. Bhattathiripad, was an Indian social reformer, cultural leader and a Malayalam writer.

Biography 
He was born in 1908 into a Nambudiri family of Kerala with limited resources due to which he received only nominal education.

He joined Yogakshema Sabha and worked with V. T. Bhattathiripad and his brother Premji. He was also an active member of Purogamana Sahitya Prasthanam. When widow marriage was considered a taboo in Nambuthiri community, he married Uma Antharjanam, younger sister of VT's wife Sreedevi Antharjanam, on 13 September 1934. This was the first known widow marriage in the Kerala Nambuthiri community. The ceremony, though boycotted by orthodox Nambudiris, was attended by Arya Pallam and M. C. Joseph. Bhattathiripad's younger brother Premji later followed his brother in 1943 by marrying a 27-year old widow named Arya Antharjanam.

When Kerala Sangeetha Nataka Akademi started its flagship publication, Keli in 1963, Bhattathiripad was the first editor.

He died on 8 October 2001, aged 93. He is survived by his three daughters. His wife predeceased him in 1996. His brother Premji also predeceased him.

Works
MRB wrote 14 books.

 Ente Omana – Play – 1927
 Marakkudakkullile Maha Narakam – Play – 1927
 Mazhavillu – Short stories – 1931
 Valkannadi – Novel – 1931
 Mukhachayakal – Travelogue – 1954
 Mula pottiya vithukal –  Travelogue – 1956
 Kinavil oru yathra –  Travelogue – 1962
 Kavisaparya –  Travelogue – 1962
 Thamarayithalukal –  Travelogue – 1967
 Ilakal Poovukal –  Travelogue – 1969
 Valapottukal – Poetic memoirs – 1968
 Suvarnachaayakal

Awards and recognitions
He was a recipient of the Kerala Sangeetha Nadaka Academy Award, the Kerala Sahithya Academy Award (1992), the Basheer Puraskaram, and the Deviprasadam Trust Award.

See also
V. T. Bhattathiripad
E. M. S. Namboodiripad

References

External links
 Profile

Further reading
 

Malayali people
1908 births
2001 deaths
Activists from Kerala
Indian social reformers
Malayalam-language writers
20th-century Indian dramatists and playwrights
Dramatists and playwrights from Kerala
Indian memoirists
20th-century Indian biographers
Indian travel writers
Novelists from Kerala
20th-century Indian novelists
20th-century memoirists